Beach.Ball.Babes (simplified Chinese: 球爱大战) is a Singaporean Chinese idol drama mainly showcasing the main leads playing beach volleyball. It was telecasted on Singapore's free-to-air channel, MediaCorp Channel 8. It made its debut on 7 July 2008 and ended on 1 August 2008. This drama serial consists of 20 episodes, and was aired on every weekday night at 9:00 pm.

Cast

Main Cast
 Christopher Lee as Ma Tian Wu
 Jesseca Liu as Cai Yan Fang 
 Joanne Peh as Liu Xuan / Liu Feng Rainie (2 roles)
 Dawn Yeoh as Wang Si Xing
 Cui Peng as Yan Fei Peng
 Pan Lingling as Wang Yiyen
 Jade Seah as Yaya
 Mark Lee as Shay

Supporting Cast
 Bernard Tan as Li Zhiliang
 Jerry Yeo as Cai Guorong
 Richard Low
 Hong Huifang
 Ye Shipin
 Wang Yu Yun
 Eelyn Kok
 Benjamin Heng
 Pamelyn Chee
 Desmond Tan

Synopsis
A shining star in the court of volleyball, Cai Yanfang (Jesseca Liu) is unfortunately self-centred and critical. She falls out with her teammates and dragged her best friend Rainie (Joanne Peh) along to switch to beach volleyball.

All is not smooth-sailing as Rainie is immensely jealous of Yanfang's talent, and they eventually break up over Ma Tianwu (Christopher Lee), Sentosa's beach bar owner. Rainie forms a new team to compete, while Yanfang discovers a hidden talent in Sixing (Dawn Yeoh), a nerdy Mathematics undergraduate at a local university.

But Yanfang's selfishness and critical nature surface and it threatens to break the partnership. Sixing also gets distracted with the good-looking Tianwu. On the eve of a major competition, Rainie is pursued by thugs whom her brother owes a lot of money, but Yanfang gets injured while trying to save her. An injured Yanfang is determined to compete, but her injury worsens at the crucial moment, will this be the end of her championship dreams?

Viewership Rating and Reception
This drama has managed to achieve considerably high viewership ratings.

Trivia 
 Some audience felt that Christopher Lee was too old to play this role, which requires him to star opposite young female actresses Dawn Yeoh and Joanne Peh.
 The first time in the drama Sixing and her mother goes to the beach in bikinis, Sixing is not wearing a seamless bra.
 The series was repeated on Mediacorp Channel 8 at 4.00 am.

External links
Official Website

Singapore Chinese dramas
2008 Singaporean television series debuts
Channel 8 (Singapore) original programming